Inder Singh (born 23 December 1943) is an India former football player and captain, manager and administrator. He played for Leaders Club (Jalandhar), JCT Mills and the India national team as a forward. He began his senior professional career with Leaders Club in 1962 and moved to JCT Mills in 1974. Playing for Punjab in the Santosh Trophy, he finished the 1974–75 tournament with 23 goals, a record that still stands. He was included in the Asian All Stars XI team in 1967 and 1968. He retired as a player in 1985.
 
He had a successful managerial career with Mills from 1985 to 2001, following which he was associated with Mills as an administrator from 2001 to 2011. In 1969, he received the Arjuna Award, in recognition of his contribution to Indian football. Nicknamed "bullet train" by the Japanese for his speed on football field, Singh stuck to his roots and played for the country, declining the offer of representing Malaysia in 1973.

Early life
Singh was born on 23 December 1943, in Phagwara, in the erstwhile Punjab Province of British India. As a student of Government High School, Phagwara, he played for the school at various tournaments, including the All-India School Games in 1960 and 1961. He finished as the top goal scorer and was awarded the 'Best Player' award.

Club career
Leaders Club

Impressed with his talent, Singh was selected by Leaders Club, Jalandhar, as its guest player. He would play exhibition matches for the club and other tournaments as a guest player, until he was signed by the club when he passed out of school. In his first season with the club in 1962 as a senior player, he played in the DCM Trophy in Delhi. The tournament had established and stronger team like Salgaocar, Mysore XI, Mohammedan and Mafatlal Mills playing. Leaders finished the tournament in third place losing only to Mafatlal Mills in the semifinal. For the third place, they beat Mysore XI 4–1. Singh finished as the top scorer for his club. Leaders managed to reach the finals of the Trophy a further four times; 1966, 1967, 1968 and 1971, but lost in the final each time.

JCT Mills

In 1974, Singh left Leaders to join another Punjab-based club, JCT Mills. He had a successful spells with Mills, winning two Durand Cup tournaments, in 1975 and 1983, and reaching the finals five times. Playing last for Mills, he retired from professional football in 1985.

Santosh Trophy
Singh played for his home state of Punjab in the Santosh Trophy. He had a hugely successful 1974–75 Santosh Trophy season captaining Punjab to the title. The team managed by Jarnail Singh, finished the tournament having scored 46 goals, with Singh scoring 23 of them, a record that still stands. The team beat Bengal in the final 6–0, with Singh scoring a hat-trick.

International career
Singh made his debut in the India national team in 1963. He was selected to play in the 1964 AFC Asian Cup in Tel Aviv. In the first game against South Korea, India won 2–0, with Singh scoring for the second goal in the 57th minute. Scoring his second goal against Hong Kong in India's 3–1 victory, he finished as the tournament's joint top scorer with two goals and India finished second. He was awarded the 'Best Right-out' at the tournament. He was part of the team at the 1966 Asian Games in Bangkok, finishing the tournament with one goal as India failed to defend its gold medal from the 1962 Games.

Singh found considerable success at the Malaysian tournament, Merdeka Cup. Making his first appearance in 1964, he finished with two goals, against Cambodia and South Korea. India finished as runner-up in the tournament. In 1967, he was included in the Asian All Stars XI team that played Arsenal in Kuala Lumpur. After missing out for two editions, he came back in 1968 and finished with three goals. He was made the captain for the first time in its 1969 tournament, where India were knocked out after the group stage games, and Singh finished the tournament with a lone goal that came against Singapore. Following an injury he sustained during its 1970 tournament, he sat out of the team for a year. He returned at its 1973 tournament as India's captain and scored a brace over Thailand, with India finishing sixth. Impressed by his performances at the tournament, he was asked to play for the Malaysian national team, by the then Malaysian Prime Minister Tunku Abdul Rahman. Singh politely refused the offer saying he would play only for Punjab and India. He made his last appearance for India in 1975.

Career statistics

Selected international goals

Post-playing career
Following his retirement of professional football as a player in 1985 with JCT Mills, he went on to manage the club for 16 years, until 2001. During his tenure, the club went on to win the Federation Cup twice in 1995 and 1996. The club also clinched National Football League title in the inaugural season of 1996–97. JCT also won IFA Shield in 1996, first club outside Kolkata to do so. They later participated in Asian Club Championship in 1996–97 and moved to second round before losing 1–2 aggregate to New Radiant of Maldives. Following his spell as a manager of his former club, he was made the Honorary Secretary of the Punjab Football Association, a post that he held from 2001 to 2011.

Honours

India
AFC Asian Cup runners-up: 1964
Merdeka Tournament runner-up: 1964; third place: 1970

Punjab
 Santosh Trophy: 1970–71, 1974–75, 1980–81

Individual
 AFC Asian Cup top scorer: 1964
 Santosh Trophy top scorer: 1974–75 (with 23 goals; Record)

Awards
 Arjuna Award: 1969
AFC Asian All Stars: 1968
 Delhi Sports Journalists Association: 1974
 Pride of Phagwara Award: 2003

See also

 History of Indian football
 History of the India national football team
 List of India national football team captains

References

Bibliography

External links
 Inder Singh – Indian Football Hall of Fame (archived on 17 May 2021)
 Details at the RSSSF

Indian footballers
Indian Sikhs
India international footballers
1964 AFC Asian Cup players
People from Kapurthala district
Footballers from Punjab, India
Recipients of the Arjuna Award
1943 births
Living people
Footballers at the 1966 Asian Games
Association football forwards
Asian Games competitors for India